Widi Dwinanda (born Cianjur, West Java on January 10, 1988) is an Indonesian actor, presenter and sportscaster. In 2015, she was awarded Commendable Female Actress for the category on Television Movies via Biopic Television Movies Ibu Een Guru Qolbu.

Filmography

Film

Television movies and host

References 

Indonesian actresses
1988 births
People from Cianjur
Living people
Indonesian writers
Indonesian voice actresses
Indonesian painters